The Augusta Correctional Center is a state prison for men located near Craigsville in Augusta County, Virginia, United States.  Owned and operated by the Virginia Department of Corrections, the facility opened in 1986 and has a working capacity of 1323 prisoners held at a medium security level.

Notable prisoners
Montie Rissell: Serial killer
Anthony Briley: One of the Briley Brothers

References

Prisons in Virginia
Buildings and structures in Augusta County, Virginia
Buildings and structures completed in 1986
1986 establishments in Virginia